The Millennium Wrestling Federation (MWF) is a New England independent professional wrestling promotion based in Melrose, Massachusetts. Founded in January 2001 by promoters Dan Mirade & Neil Manolian, the MWF is one of the top promotions in the Northeastern United States along with Chaotic Wrestling, New England Championship Wrestling and Yankee Pro Wrestling.

Among the wrestlers who have appeared in the promotion include independent wrestlers Abyss, A.J. Styles, Kofi Kingston, Joey Mercury, Antonio Thomas, Chris Sabin, Alex Shelley, Rick Fuller, Homicide, and R. J. Brewer.

Due to its close working relationship with World Wrestling Entertainment, the promotion is one of several on the independent circuit to regularly feature many former World Wrestling Federation veterans including "Road Dog" Jesse James Armstrong, Scotty 2 Hotty, Al Snow, Kamala, Demolition (Ax and Smash) and MWF President Paul Bearer. Former WWF World Heavyweight Champion The Iron Sheik served as MWF Lt. Commissioner. Others who have also made appearances include The Missing Link, Bob Orton Jr. and Ox Baker.

John Cena Sr., the father of multi-time World Heavyweight Champion John Cena, took control of the promotion in September 2007 after buying out Chairman Neil Manolian's partial stock in the company. Cena became MWF South President after a confrontation with Paul Bearer at Soul Survivor VIII.

History
The Millennium Wrestling Federation was founded by Dan Mirade and Neil Manolian in January 2001, partly founded in memory of longtime Boston promoter Tony Rumble and held their first show on September 28 of that year. Based in Melrose, Massachusetts, the promotion regularly began running shows in the greater Boston area for over a year before the debut of its weekly half-hour television program MWF Xtra on Labor Day weekend. The show was hosted by Dan Mirade and MWF on-air personalities The Jackal & Dr. Brad Von Johnson as well as special guest Tiger Mulligan, who would later win the promotion's Heavyweight Championship defeating "2Xtreme" John Brooks in the tournament finals of the "Soul Survivor" competition at the Soul Survivor I supercard to crown the first MWF Heavyweight Champion and was presented the championship belt by Bobby "The Brain" Heenan.

On October 5, 2002, Gary Michael Cappetta & Superstar Billy Graham appeared at a MWF benefit show at the America Civic Center in Wakefield, Massachusetts. The card also featured Road Dogg and the MWF debuts of "Die Hard" Eddie Edwards & Todd Hanson.

A second show, MWF ULTRA, was also introduced with its first episode on October 12, 2003, but eventually became a monthly, one-hour special in October 2004. Its guests have included Johnny Fabulous, Karl Lauer, Scotty 2 Hotty, Demolition Smash, The Iron Sheik, Percy Pringle and actress Brigitte Nielsen. In addition to its wide use of regional cable TV throughout the New England area, the promotion also began broadcasting its shows via internet broadcast and in-demand in May 2005 and became available in over 60 countries. That same year, the two more championships were created with "Die Hard" Eddie Edwards winning a tournament for the MWF Television Championship and, at MWF Iron Sheik Appreciation Night, Todd Hanson and Beau Douglas won a Tag Team Royal Rumble eliminating The Islanders for the titles. The MWF Heavyweight Championship, which had since become vacant, was won by Dylan Kage when he defeated Slyck Wagner Brown on the first episode of MWF ULTRA.

On November 11, 2005, the Soul Survivor III supercard featured MWF Heavyweight Champion Dylan Kage joining forces with Paul Bearer defeating Luis Ortiz, and MWF Television Champion Eddie Edwards defending his title against Fergal Devitt & John Walters in the main event in Lynn, Massachusetts. The show also featured Test, The Sandman, The Missing Link and Ox Baker . NWA Ireland wrestler Fergal Devitt appeared at several MWF events while in New England during his 2005-2006 US tour. Facing Eddie Edwards and John Walters in a triple treat for the MWF TV Title, the match ended after 15 minutes when Edwards pinned Walters for the title. This match, gained considerable attention on the US independent scene.

Involved in fundraising and other community projects, the Millennium Wrestling Federation's on-going Keep The Kids Off The Streets Campaign presents live wrestling events in inner city neighborhoods. Its efforts in fundraising activities has raised tens of thousands of dollars for a number of charities and non-profit organizations including the American Red Cross, the Special Olympics and has received extensive press coverage from The Boston Globe, The Howard Stern Show, KISS 108 FM, the Eddie Andelman Show, CN8 Sports Pulse and ESPN Radio. The promotion has also been involved in promoting other non-wrestling events in Boston such as hosting the Boston premiere of The Condemned (including a Q&A with "Stone Cold" Steve Austin) and The Iron Sheik's appearance on Toronto's Hi-Fi Network and promoting the Wrestling's Living Legends reunion on the morning of WrestleMania 23 in Windsor, Ontario. The event also featured Demolition (Ax and Smash) in their first appearance in sixteen years.

In September 2007, MWF Chairman Neil Manolian sold his share of the promotion to John Cena Sr., giving him majority control of the company, and as a result, was named MWF President three months later, replacing on-air personality The Jackal who had been appointed to the position at the beginning of the year.  During the first half of 2008, a number of wrestlers from Total Nonstop Action Wrestling appeared for the promotion. On March 29, the promotion held its first show in Nashua, New Hampshire at Live Free or Die.

On June 21, the MWF held the final professional wrestling event at the Good Time Emporium in Somerville, Massachusetts prior to its close at the end of the month. The "Night of Champions" supercard included MWF Heavyweight Champion Todd Hanson successfully defending his title against Abyss, Rick Fuller and Executioner Milonas in a Monster's Ball match. The undercard featured a lumberjack match between MWF Television Champion Tommaso Ciampa and Jay Lethal, MWF Tag Team Champions The Canadian Superstars against Beau Douglas and a mystery partner.  The event also had the debut of Homicide and the return of Chris Sabin. This was followed by a VIP Q&A session and an autograph/photo fanfest with Abyss, Jay Lethal, Homicide, Chris Sabin and Leticia Cline as well as a special appearance by MWF President John Cena Sr. and the Iron Sheik. The promotion also held a raffle in which the winner would receive a free lunch with the Iron Sheik. The event was originally scheduled to be held on March 29, however the promotion was forced to reschedule the event when Total Nonstop Action Wrestling needed Jay Lethal, Chris Sabin and Homicide for an additional television taping of TNA Impact! during WrestleMania weekend in Orlando, Florida.

Dan Mirade died unexpectedly on March 7, 2022. He was 41 years old.

Controversy

Iron Sheik
A regular on the independent circuit since the early 1990s, the Iron Sheik became associated with the MWF soon after its establishment and was later named the MWF Lt. Commissioner. On August 5, 2005, the Iron Sheik, Dan Mirade and MWF Commissioner Dr. Brad Von Johnson were involved in a serious car accident when they were hit head on by a drunk driver following an event, Iron Sheik Appreciation Night, in Blackstone, Massachusetts. The Iron Sheik caused a disturbance at the event earlier refusing to sign autographs or to actively participate in the show going on a drug induced episode in the parking lot locking himself in a wrestler's car. The three were later treated at a local hospital and the Iron Sheik later claimed he might never wrestle again.

In November 2004, during an MWF Studio shoot interview with Dan Mirade, the Iron Sheik went on a tirade when asked about his appearance at WrestleMania III with Nikolai Volkoff and their match against The Killer Bees (B. Brian Blair and Jim Brunzell) making several controversial and derogatory statements in reference to Brian Blair. This interview was later released on a three-hour DVD and has since become popular on websites such as YouTube and led to his appearances on Howard Stern. The video has been seen by over one and a half million fans. However, in 2005, the Iron Sheik was inducted into the WWE Hall of Fame.

In 2008, the MWF conducted another shoot interview with the Iron Sheik. Similarly released on DVD, the Sheik verbally attacked Hulk Hogan and The Ultimate Warrior, making remarks about what he'd do to the Warrior's daughter if she was 18. He later made a Christmas challenge to Kramer, footage from the infamous Iron Sheik Appreciation Night and a "drug induced" telephone interview. The Sheik was attacked by the MWF Stalker, claiming he had gotten alcohol poisoning when an MWF cameraman had given him beer in his hotel room.

Jim Neidhart
On December 28, 2001, the promotion held its second live event in Revere, Massachusetts which was to raise money for Butch Miller, better known as Bushwhacker Butch of The Bushwhackers, who was hospitalized from an untreated staph infection. Among those who headlined the show included Road Dogg and ECW wrestlers Little Guido, Super Nova and Chris Chetti. Tough Enough finalist Christopher Nowinski also made a surprise appearance.

A few weeks prior to the event, Jim "The Anvil" Neidhart contacted the promotion via e-mail offering to appear at the show. Neidhart also said he would donate an official Hart Foundation leather jacket for the raffle being held. In exchange, the promotion agreed to provide transportation. When the company was unable to afford to fly him in from Calgary, which would cost at least $1,200 (more than the cost of the actual fundraiser), Neidhart offered to sell his frequent flyer miles for $500 which the promotion accepted.

The promotion received no contact from Neidhart after that point and, on the day of the fundraiser, Neidhart did not arrive. According to owner Dan Mirade, he was later told that Neidhart had been planning on coming to Boston to spend Christmas week with a "ring rat". When she decided to spend Christmas with her family down south, Neidhart stayed in Calgary and did not return the money he received from the promotion.

Receiving no response to their e-mail and telephone messages, the promotion posted Neidhart's home phone number on the front page of the MWF website. The promotion, which had gotten a number of replies from fans asking for an explanation for Neidhart's absence, explained that they had not received word from Neidhart and suggested fans to confront Neidhart themselves.

Neidhart got in contact with the promotion soon after this and claimed that he had intended to send the money back, but now refused because they had "upset him". Neidhart eventually claimed in a later e-mail that he had sent the $500 to Butch Miller, however this was denied by both Butch Miller and longtime tag team partner Luke Williams. Soon after seeing him on the Raw 15th anniversary show, Dan Mirade wrote about the incident on his website and challenged Neidhart for an explanation however Neidhart did not respond.

Criticism of the professional wrestling industry
Mirade has been increasingly outspoken against both the increasing violence of "hardcore wrestling" as well as steroid and drug abuse which has resulted in the deaths of a high number of professional wrestlers. Dan Mirade also criticized certain ethical standards and business practices, particularly after the ring death of independent wrestler Dan Quirk, advocating some sort of system to regulate the professional wrestling industry.

"What most fans of mainstream wrestling don't realize is what a corrupt business it is that they're fans of... Back in the 'good ole days' not EVERYONE that wanted to be a professional wrestler could be one... There are dozens if not hundreds of 'schools' in operations in this country. How many of them are operated by a mark [a fan who believes that some or all of professional wrestling is real] that belongs sitting at home watching it on TV, someone that was never trained properly themselves?

"These schools, will continue to mis-train and horrible shows will continue to ruin what the pros used to do... What's even sadder... is that there are many Dan Quirk situations waiting to happen. For his sake and his family's sake, I hope that wrestling can police itself and weed out those that don't belong."

Tony Rumble Memorial Battle Royal
The Tony Rumble Memorial Battle Royal is the main event held at the semi-annual memorial show for the late Tony Rumble, a wrestler and longtime wrestling promoter in the New England area throughout the 1990s. Todd Hanson won the first on the November 22, 2003 MWF Ultra program.

The next battle royal was held at the MWF's Soul Survivor II and won by Bull Montana, a close friend of Tony Rumble, on November 13, 2004. The third show was co-hosted by the MWF and AWA New England which was won by 72-year-old Ox Baker. This was his first wrestling match in several years. On August 4, 2007, Rick Fuller won the 4th annual Tony Rumble Memorial Battle Royal.

Winners

Championships

MWF Undisputed Championship 
The MWF Undisputed Championship is a professional wrestling title in American independent promotion Millennium Wrestling Federation. The title was created when Low Ki was stripped from the MWF Heavyweight Championship. Carlito defeated Eddie Edwards, X-Pac, Luis Ortiz and Slyck Wagner Brown. The title was primarily defended in the greater Boston area as well as in southern New England.

MWF Television Championship 
The MWF Television Championship is a professional wrestling title in American independent promotion Millennium Wrestling Federation. The title was created when Eddie Edwards defeated Jerelle Clark in the finals of a championship tournament to crown the first MWF Television Champion on February 5, 2003. The title is primarily defended in the Greater Boston Area and southern New England.

MWF Tag Team Championship 
The MWF Tag Team Championship is a professional wrestling title in American independent promotion Millennium Wrestling Federation. The title was created when Todd Hanson & Beau Douglas defeated The Islanders in a Texas Tornado match at Iron Sheik Appreciation Night in Blackstone, Massachusetts on August 5, 2003. The four had been the last remaining teams in a Royal Rumble along with nine other tag teams. The tag team titles are primarily defended in the greater Boston area and southern New England. There have been a total of 5 recognized individual champions and 3 recognized teams, who have had a combined 4 official reigns.

See also
List of independent wrestling promotions in the United States

References

External links

Independent professional wrestling promotions based in Massachusetts
Professional wrestling controversies